Tuscola County is a county in the Thumb region of the U.S. state of Michigan. As of the 2020 census, the population was 53,323. The county seat is Caro.  The county was created by Michigan Law on April 1, 1840, from land in Sanilac County and attached to Saginaw County for administrative purposes. The Michigan Legislature passed an act on March 2, 1850, that empowered the county residents to organize governmental functions.

Tuscola County is one of five counties in the Thumb area. Like the rest of the thumb, Tuscola County enjoys seasonal tourism from cities like Flint, Detroit and Saginaw.

History

The name Tuscola was a neologism created by Henry Schoolcraft and had an aboriginal root. That source likely was the native Ojibwe name "desakamigaa" that means the flat level ground or simply the flat country. For an ending, Mr. Schoolcraft then used a form of the Latin word "colo" that means to cultivate, till, or farm or a land that is cultivated. For the suffix, the related Latin word "colonia" from which we get today the word colony means a farm estate. Tuscola then means the flat cultivated land.  Henry Schoolcraft once wrote that Tuscola was derived from Native words and meant level lands. A similar word to desakamigaa is the Ojibwe word "desinaagan" that is translated as dinner plate. Shell in their language is "ess". The Ojibwe often used a shell or bark from a tree for a dish. The Ojibwe prefixes "desi-" and "tessa" are used to form their words for flat objects such as a shelf, platform, bench, or plate.

The Thumb of Michigan, which also includes Huron and Sanilac Counties, was originally called by Iroquois speaking people "Skenchioe" in the 17th century, which may be related to the Onondaga word "uschwuntschios" meaning a champaign or large extended plain.  In the early 18th century, the French called the Thumb of Michigan "Le Pays Plat" that means The Flat Country. The French word "pays" means country while "plat" means flat.  The English in the later 18th Century also called the land back from the shoreline around the Thumb of Michigan the Flat Country.  The Thumb of Michigan forms a tableland with knolls or hillocks located in the central part of the Thumb along the Cass River. The county seat of Tuscola is Caro that is located north of the Cass River along one of these large knolls. The land around Caro particularly to the west, north, and northeast is widely farmed and cultivated.  The township in which Caro lies was named Indianfields because it was a place of many early Native American gardens.

At the Treaty of Saginaw of 1819, the native leader who represented the Cass River and the Tuscola area was Chief Otusson. Otusson's Reservation was located where today lies Frankenmuth, MI. Otusson's Reservation along with a large amount of the surrounding land was sold by the Treaty of 1837.

Geography

Adjacent counties
 Huron County  (north)
 Sanilac County  (east)
 Saginaw County  (west)
 Lapeer County  (southeast)
 Genesee County  (southwest)
 Bay County  (west)

Major highways
 , runs north and south
 , runs north and south
 , runs north and south
 , runs east and west
 , runs east and west
 , runs east and west

Airport
 Tuscola Area Airport

Demographics

The 2010 United States Census indicates Tuscola County had a 2010 population of 55,729. This is a decrease of -2,537 people from the 2000 United States Census. Overall, the county had a -4.4% growth rate during this ten-year period. In 2010 there were 21,590 households and 15,423 families in the county. The population density was 69.4 per square mile (26.8 square kilometers). There were 24,451 housing units at an average density of 30.4 per square mile (11.7 square kilometers). 96.1% of the population were White, 1.1% Black or African American, 0.5% Native American, 0.3% Asian, 0.7% of some other race and 1.2% of two or more races. 2.8% were Hispanic or Latino (of any race). 32.3% were of German, 9.0% English, 8.4% Polish, 8.0% Irish, 7.8% American and 6.2% French, French Canadian or Cajun ancestry.

There were 21,590 households, out of which 30.9% had children under the age of 18 living with them, 56.5% were husband and wife families, 9.9% had a female householder with no husband present, 28.6% were non-families, and 24.0% were made up of individuals. The average household size was 2.52 and the average family size was 2.97.

In the county, the population was spread out, with 23.5% under age of 18, 7.9% from 18 to 24, 23.0% from 25 to 44, 29.8% from 45 to 64, and 15.8% who were 65 years of age or older. The median age was 42 years. For every 100 females there were 100.6 males. For every 100 females age 18 and over, there were 98.6 males.

The 2010 American Community Survey 3-year estimate  indicates the median income for a household in the county was $40,839 and the median income for a family was $49,274. Males had a median income of $28,288 versus $15,314 for females. The per capita income for the county was $19,470. About 1.7% of families and 17.2% of the population were below the poverty line, including 23.0% of those under the age 18 and 11.0% of those age 65 or over.

Religion
The Roman Catholic Diocese of Saginaw is the controlling regional body for the Catholic Church.

Government
Tuscola County has been strongly Republican for most of its history, only failing to back a Republican candidate four times in presidential elections from 1884 to the present day.

The county government operates the jail, maintains rural roads, operates the
major local courts, keeps files of deeds and mortgages, maintains vital records, administers
public health regulations, and participates with the state in the provision of welfare and
other social services. The county board of commissioners controls the
budget but has only limited authority to make laws or ordinances.  In Michigan, most local
government functions — police and fire, building and zoning, tax assessment, street
maintenance, etc. — are the responsibility of individual cities and townships.

Elected officials

 Prosecuting Attorney: Mark E. Reene
 Sheriff: Glen Skrent
 County Clerk: Jodi Fetting
 County Treasurer: Patricia Donovan
 Register of Deeds: John Bishop
 Drain Commissioner: Robert Mantey
 Circuit Court Judge: Hon. Amy Gierhart
 Probate Court Judge: Hon. Nancy Thane
 District Court Judge: Hon. Kim David Glaspie
 County Commissioner District 1: Tom Young (R)
 County Commissioner District 2: Thomas Bardwell (R)
 County Commissioner District 3: Kim Vaughan (R)
 County Commissioner District 4: Mark Jensen (R)
 County Commissioner District 5: Daniel Grimshaw (R)

Communities

Cities
 Caro (county seat)
 Vassar

Villages

 Akron
 Cass City
 Fairgrove
 Gagetown
 Kingston
 Mayville
 Millington
 Reese
 Unionville

Census-designated place
 Fostoria

Other unincorporated communities

 Bay Park
 Bach
 Bradleyville
 Colling
 Colwood
 Dayton
 Deford
 Denmark Junction
 East Dayton
 Ellington
 Elmwood
 Gilford
 Juniata
 Karrs Corner
 Oakhurst
 Quanicassee
 Richville
 Silverwood
 Thomas
 Tuscola
 Wahjamega
 Watrousville
 Wisner
 Wilmot

Charter township
 Almer Charter Township

General law townships

 Akron Township
 Arbela Township
 Columbia Township
 Dayton Township
 Denmark Township
 Elkland Township
 Ellington Township
 Elmwood Township
 Fairgrove Township
 Fremont Township
 Gilford Township
 Indianfields Township
 Juniata Township
 Kingston Township
 Koylton Township
 Millington Township
 Novesta Township
 Tuscola Township
 Vassar Township
 Watertown Township
 Wells Township
 Wisner Township

See also
 List of Michigan State Historic Sites in Tuscola County, Michigan
 National Register of Historic Places listings in Tuscola County, Michigan

References

Further reading

External links
 Tuscola County
 

 
Michigan counties
1850 establishments in Michigan
Populated places established in 1850